Refurbishment is the distribution of products (generally electronics) that have been previously returned to a manufacturer or vendor for any reason, not sold in the market or new launch of a product. Refurbished products are normally tested for functionality and defects before they are sold to the public. They are repaired by the original manufacturer and resold.

Description
The main difference between "refurbished" and "used" products is that refurbished products have been tested and verified to function properly, and are thus free of defects, while "used" products may or may not be defective. Refurbished products may be unused customer returns that are essentially "new" items, or they may be defective products that were returned under warranty, and resold by the manufacturer after repairing the defects and ensuring proper function.

Other types of products that may be sold as "refurbished" include:

 Items used in field tests, sales displays or demonstrations
 Items returned for reasons other than defect, and tested by the manufacturer
 Items returned to the manufacturer because the box or item was damaged in shipping
 Used items that have been donated to a charity or non-profit organization
 Leftover equipment sold by a downsized company to a third party refurbisher

The following types of products are considered recycled, not refurbished:

 Previously leased units that are returned and resold after the lease ends
 Used electronics that have been returned to an electronic recycling program

Various types
Different companies and industries may have different types of "refurbished" products. Since the electronics industry doesn't have a firm, widely accepted definition of "refurbished", its exact meaning may vary from one product to the next, or one company to the next. In various cases "refurbished" may be synonymous with "reconditioned", "refreshed", "repaired", "recertified", or "like new". The term "remanufacture" is a distinct term used for products that are returned to the identical-to-new condition in industrial closed-loop processes, and which often possess the same warranties and guarantees as a new product.

In the refurbished mobile phone sector, it is very likely that the mobile phones have been used on a daily basis by the original user. It is very common for them to then sell their current phone when looking for upgrades. This is when refurbished phone sellers would receive them through various methods (such as trade-in sites) and use modern-day software to check that all hardware and software on the phone is working as intended.

In the mobile refurbished industry, various companies set the criteria of a grading system for items. It indicates the overall condition of a smartphone. Their team of quality assurance thoroughly views the screen, scratches, battery time, camera, charging port, sealed or not, and software changes. They called it to grade A, grade B, like a new and open box. Some companies call it good, very good, and excellent. The price depends on the grade of the smartphone to let the customer know what condition they are paying.

Market fragmentation 
Due to the fact that there is no legal definition for refurbishment, the quality of a refurbished product will depend on the source who reconditioned it, and not every refurbisher provides what customers expect. In a Consumer Reports Survey, only 52% of respondents said their refurbished phones included new batteries. Another common occurrence is refurbishers who do not adequately wipe the data before reselling a smart device. This leads to major privacy breaches and consumer distrust, according to a Blancco study.

While the majority of refurbishers have the best intentions to inspect, clean, repair and repackage items to the best possible condition, consumers are taking a risk if they don't do their due diligence before buying. The most reputable companies offer warranties, easy returns, and verified batteries and accessories.

The demand for refurbished handsets is rising tremendously after the increase in inflation. Used items are lower in price as compared to new one, people starts to buy second-hand items since the Pandemic caused a global recession. As if this was not enough already, Russia's invasion of Ukraine and supply chain issues across the world begins. For all these reasons peoples now tend to buy refurbished electronics rather than new ones. These refurbished items include laptops, tablets, mobiles, smart watches, and more.

See also
 Electronics right to repair
 Factory second

References

Electronics manufacturing
Recycling industry
Sustainable business